Pirate Harbour is a small community in the Canadian province of Nova Scotia, located in the Municipality of the District of Guysborough in Guysborough County.  It is located just south of Mulgrave, Nova Scotia, on the west side of the Strait of Canso. The Mi'kmaq name for the place was Tesogwode, "the place where goods were sorted." The name Pirate Harbour was allegedly given because the space between the small island and the cove provided safe anchorage and a hiding place for pirates such as Captain Kidd and Paul Jones.  A settlement was established in 1785, and early settlers included John Wilson and John Peeples, who each received a thousand-acre grant there in 1785.

References

Guysborough County Genealogy
Pirate Harbour on Destination Nova Scotia

Communities in Guysborough County, Nova Scotia
General Service Areas in Nova Scotia